The Canadian Pacific Railway (CPR) owned several subsidiary railways.  The CPR often built or acquired lines through subsidiaries. Many of these subsidiaries retained their identity for an extended amount of time, others were only on paper.

Canadian Atlantic Railway
International Railway of Maine
New Brunswick Railway
Dominion Atlantic Railway
 Central Maine and Quebec Railway
Columbia and Kootenay Railway
 Dakota, Minnesota and Eastern Railroad
Esquimalt and Nanaimo Railway
Grand River Railway
Kaslo and Slocan Railway
Kettle Valley Railway
Lake Erie and Northern Railway
Nakusp and Slocan Railway
Ontario and Quebec Railway
Quebec Central Railway
Toronto, Grey and Bruce Railway
Toronto, Hamilton and Buffalo Railway
St. Lawrence and Hudson Railway
Delaware and Hudson Railway
Soo Line Railroad

 
Rail transport-related lists